Burn is a debut studio album by British jazz band Sons of Kemet released on 9 September 2013 by Naim Records label. This album, and their running series of critically acclaimed performances, led to them winning the 'Best Jazz Act' in the 2013 MOBO Awards.

Producers such as Micachu, Vince Vella, and Alex Patchwork have remixed various songs from the Burn album.

Reception
Phil Johnson of The Independent stated, "this is mesmerising trance music of great power." John Fordham of The Guardian noted, "Opening with the galloping-hooves drumming, pulpy tuba hook and Pharoah Sanders-like sax supplications of All Will Surely Burn, the album goes on to balance thunder and reflectiveness surprisingly evenly..." The Arts Desk 's Matthew Wright awarded the album five stars out of five, commenting, "This is still a stunningly vivid and original album, bursting with fresh ideas. What else could simultaneously provoke a rave and a panel discussion about the roots of jazz?" Robert Christgau wrote, "A debut that flaunts their sound, suggests their parameters, and establishes their bona fides." Mike Hobart in his review for Financial Times observed, "The Sons of Kemet deliver insidious riffs, intriguing textures, and a whopping beat..."

Track listing 
 "All Will Surely Burn"   6:19
 "The Godfather"          5:16
 "Inner Babylon"          5:20
 "The Book of Disquiet"   5:34
 "Going Home"             3:52
 "Adonia's Lullaby"       4:11
 "Song for Galeano"       4:24
 "Beware"                 3:37
 "The It Is"              2:28
 "Rivers of Babylon"      8:37

Awards 
Winners
 The Arts Desk - Album of the Year 2013
 iTunes Jazz (UK) Best of 2013 (#1)

Nominations
 Gilles Peterson Worldwide Awards - Album Of The Year 2013 (#8)
 The Quietus - Album Of The Year (#59)

References

External links 
 Sons Of Kemet @ YouTube.

2013 albums
Sons of Kemet albums